The Kharlamov Cup is the trophy presented to the winner of the Russian Junior Hockey League (MHL) playoffs, and is named after ice hockey player Valeri Kharlamov, considered to be one of the greatest ice hockey players of the World.

The cup was designed by Frank Meisler.

Cup winners

See also
Gagarin Cup, awarded to the winner of the KHL playoffs
Petrov Cup, awarded to the winner of the VHL playoffs

References

External links
 , Play-offs finals 2010 match 4 official gallery with Mikhail Churlyaev of Steel Foxes holding the trophy
 Section about the Kharlamov Cup with a photo of the cup on the official website of MHL

Russian ice hockey trophies and awards
Junior Hockey League (Russia)